Agios Ioannis ( for Saint John) may refer to the following places or churches

Cyprus
Agios Ioannis (Pyrgos), a village near Kato Pyrgos
Agios Ioannis Malountas, a village near Malounta
Agios Ioannis, Limassol, a village in Limassol District
Agios Ioannis, Paphos, a village in Paphos District
Agios Ioannis (church in Larnaca), a church in the neighborhood of Prodromos, Larnaca

Greece
Agios Ioannis, older name of Syrna (island), an island in the Aegean Sea
Agios Ioannis, Chania, a village in the municipality Sfakia, Chania regional unit
Agios Ioannis, Corfu, a village in the municipal unit Parelioi, Corfu
Agios Ioannis, Elis, a village in the municipality Pyrgos, Elis
Agios Ioannis, Ithaca, a village on the Strait of Ithaca
Agios Ioannis, Kavala, a settlement in the city of Kavala, Kavala regional unit
Agios Ioannis, Evrotas, a village in the municipality Evrotas, Laconia
Agios Ioannis, Monemvasia, a village in the municipality Monemvasia, Laconia
Agios Ioannis, Sparti, a village in the municipality Sparti, Laconia
Agios Ioannis, Lasithi, a village in Lasithi, Crete
Agios Ioannis, Magnesia, a village in the municipal unit Sourpi, Magnesia
Agios Ioannis, Pelion, a village and beach resort in Pelion, Magnesia
Agios Ioannis Rentis, a suburb of Athens
Agios Ioannis, Mykonos, a beach resort on the island of Mykonos